Polborder is a hamlet south of St Mellion in Cornwall, England.

References

Hamlets in Cornwall